The Malente–Lütjenburg railway was a standard gauge, branch line in the north German state of Schleswig-Holstein. It was built by the businessman, Janus, who ran the Holsteinische Schweiz hotel, that gave its name to the local station on the line. It is currently closed.

The line was planned to use a  narrow gauge railway for tourist traffic prior to the railway's closure.  The future of the railway is uncertain.

Route 

 List of stations and halts 
Its stations and halts are:

 Gremskamp (Flohmarkthalle) (former Malente-Güterbahnhof - goods station)
 0.00 Bad Malente-Gremsmühlen; formerly a "wedge station" (Keilbahnhof) between the Kiel–Lübeck railway and this line; from 31 May 1866
 Malentino (Kleinbahn halt); since 5 December 2006
 Malente Markt (Kleinbahn halt); since 2007
 Malente-Neversfelde; since 19 July 2008
 2.01 Malente-Nord (since 13 September 2008 Eggersdorf); from summer 1954
 3.89 Holsteinische Schweiz; from 25 May 1890
 5.49 Bruhnskoppel; from 1890
 6.72 Malkwitz; from summer 1954
 8.32 Benz; from 1890
 9.60 Flehm; from summer 1955
 11.15 Kletkamp; from 8 December 1890
 13.00 Blekendorf; from summer 1954
 15.20 Friederikenthal; from summer 1954
 Schmiedendorf; from 1 June 1891 to 14 October 1892
 17.26 Lütjenburg

 History 

The contract for the construction of the line was signed on 15 May 1888. The railway was opened in several stages.

 References 

 Sources 
 Hamelau, Olaf (2008). Hein Lüttenborg. Die Nebenbahn Malente-Gremsmühlen–Lütjenburg. Sutton-Verlag, Erfurt 2008, 
 Hamelau, Olaf (2010).  Die Eisenbahn in Ostholstein''. Sutton-Verlag, Erfurt 2010,

External links 
History of the line, track plans, etc.
Zukunftspläne – Article by the Lübecker Nachrichten (2008)
Hein Lüttenborg Museum Railway
Feld- und Kleinbahn Betriebs gGmbH

Railway lines in Schleswig-Holstein
Heritage railways in Germany
600 mm gauge railways in Germany
Ostholstein
Plön (district)